The Shire of Coorow is a local government area located in the Mid West region of Western Australia, about  north of Perth, the state capital, and about  south of the city of Geraldton.

History
Historically, the area was part of the Carnamah Road District. On 19 April 1962, the Shire of Coorow was created.

Wards
The Shire has eight councillors, elected at large. Wards were abolished in 2003.

Towns and localities
The towns and localities of the Shire of Coorow with population and size figures based on the most recent Australian census:

Population

Heritage-listed places

As of 2023, 76 places are heritage-listed in the Shire of Coorow, of which none are on the State Register of Heritage Places.

References

External links
 
 Biographical Dictionary of Coorow, Carnamah and Three Springs

 
Coorow